1962 in Algeria:

Incumbents
Head of State: 
 until 22 July: Benyoucef Benkhedda 
 22 July-25 September: Abderrahmane Farès
 starting 25 September: Ferhat Abbas
Prime Minister: Ahmed Ben Bella (starting 27 September)

Events
This was the year that Algeria's revolution against French colonization officially ended after the peace talks in March of that year between the NLF (National Liberation Front) and the French government. This was followed by a ceasefire called between the NLF and the OAS, a secret army determined to keep Algeria a French colony, which was what officially ended the fighting.

July
1 July: the Algerian Évian Accords referendum, 1962

September
26 September: the Algerian legislative election, 1962

Births

 January 21: Ali BenHalima (Algerian international footballer)
 February 2: Mustapha Moussa (Algerian boxer)
February 5: Chaba Fadela (an Algerian raï musician and actress)

References

 
Algeria